The circuit Reims-Gueux was a Grand Prix motor racing road course, located in Gueux, 7.5 km (5 miles) west of Reims in the Champagne region of north-eastern France, established in 1926 as the second venue of the Grand Prix de la Marne. The triangular layout of public roads formed three sectors between the villages of Thillois and Gueux over the La Garenne / Gueux intersection of Route nationale 31. The circuit became known to be among the fastest of the era for its two long straights (approximately 2.2 km; 1¼ miles in length each) allowing maximum straight-line speed, resulting in many famous slipstream battles.

Circuit history 

Motor racing at Reims started in 1926 with the second Grand Prix de la Marne, relocating the race from the square-shaped  Circuit de Beine-Nauroy east of Reims to Reims-Gueux, west of Reims. Gradual improvements in track width to a few sections including the Garenne-Gueux / Thillois corners prior to the 1932 Grand Prix de France contributed to a new published circuit length of  after which the circuit remained essentially the same until 1937.

Organizational changes prior to the 1938 GP de France saw extensive widening of the Thillois-Gueux straight. The process was reported to have felled trees and demolished structures to make the circuit yet faster, concluding the Grand Prix era with the 1938-1939 championship editions of the French Grand Prix.

Racing at Reims-Gueux resumed in 1947 with the 16th Grand Prix de Reims, effectively ending the Grand Prix de la Marne series except for a last edition in 1952. 1948 and 1949 saw the first Formula 1 cars at Reims-Gueux for two non-championship rounds. By then temporary grandstands were established fixtures at the Gueux / La Garenne and Thillois corners and after hosting the sixth round of the inaugural 1950 World Drivers' Championship, it became clear that the circuit needed further extensive renovations to comply with the accelerating Formula 1 technology.

This public road circuit had previously been made up entirely of straights with a few slight and very fast kinks and slow corners; with the addition of these 3 fast sweepers and the extension of the main straight, this circuit, which was already very fast- was now even faster than it had been before, by about 4-5 mph per lap.

The last year for Formula One at Reims came in 1966, final sports car competitions were held in 1969 and Motorcycle racing continued for another 3 years. In 1972, Reims-Gueux closed permanently due to financial difficulties. There was to be a historic race held in 1997 but it was cancelled for technical reasons several months before it was due to take place and by 2002, the bulldozers arrived to demolish some portions of the track. A few sections of the old circuit are still visible today around the pit lane, at the D26 / D27 round-about and a part of the D26 extension at the Hovette corner to what once was the 1953 Muizon hair-pin (visible on current sat. images).

Today, the old RN31 straight between Muizon and Thillois is a wider dual carriageway, although it does follow the same line as the original two-lane road of the former circuit. It is still possible to drive a lap around the (more or less) original 1926 version (through the center of Gueux) and the 1952 variant of the circuit, except for the old Garenne -junction which was demolished as part of the RN31 modernization. It is no longer possible to complete a lap of the circuit used from 1953 onwards as the tarmac between Bretelle Nord and Muizon has been removed. Les Amis du Circuit de Gueux (a non-profit organization) is working to preserve the old pit building, grandstands and other remaining structures of the circuit and actively support historic meetings which use the 1952 Circuit d'Essais.

Lap records
The official race lap records at the Reims-Gueux are listed as:

Racing series at Reims-Gueux

Reims-Gueux by year 

Legend

Sports car racing at Reims-Gueux by year (condensed)

Reims-Gueux Circuits by years

See also 
 Grand Prix de la Marne
 12 Hours of Reims

References

External links
Friends of the Circuit of Gueux (in French)
The Abandoned 1950 Grand Prix Track That’s… Still There (video documentary; 10min) – The Tim Traveller (January 2020)

External links 

 Amis du Circuit de Gueux (Palmares)
 Circuit Reims-Gueux (1926-1969) on Google Maps (Historic Grand Prix Circuits)

Pre-World Championship Grand Prix circuits
Formula One circuits
French Grand Prix
World Sportscar Championship races
Auto races in France
Grand Prix motorcycle circuits
Defunct motorsport venues in France
Sport in Reims